Andrzej Wojciech Seweryn (born 27 November 1948) is a Polish former basketball player. He competed in the men's tournament at the 1972 Summer Olympics.

References

1948 births
Living people
Polish men's basketball players
Olympic basketball players of Poland
Basketball players at the 1972 Summer Olympics
Sportspeople from Kraków